Galesburg is a city in Neosho County, Kansas, United States.  As of the 2020 census, the population of the city was 149.

History
Christopher and Elvina Boje gave land to build the town of Galesburg in 1871.
Their daughter, Etta met and married Samuel Magner and raised family there.
Galesburg was laid out and platted in 1871 when the railroad was extended to that point. A post office established in Rose Hill (an extinct town) was moved to Galesburg, and opened in March 1871.

Geography
Galesburg is located at  (37.472415, -95.355892).

Climate
The climate in this area is characterized by hot, humid summers and generally mild to cool winters.  According to the Köppen Climate Classification system, Galesburg has a humid subtropical climate, abbreviated "Cfa" on climate maps.

Demographics

2010 census
As of the census of 2010, there were 126 people, 58 households, and 39 families residing in the city. The racial makeup of the city was 98.4% White, 0.8% Native American, and 0.8% from two or more races. Hispanic or Latino of any race were 2.4% of the population.

There were 58 households, of which 20.7% had children under the age of 18 living with them, 50.0% were married couples living together, 12.1% had a female householder with no husband present, 5.2% had a male householder with no wife present, and 32.8% were non-families. 32.8% of all households were made up of individuals, and 13.8% had someone living alone who was 65 years of age or older. The average household size was 2.17 and the average family size was 2.72.

The median age in the city was 50.5 years. 19% of residents were under the age of 18; 5.7% were between the ages of 18 and 24; 22.3% were from 25 to 44; 30.9% were from 45 to 64; and 22.2% were 65 years of age or older. The gender makeup of the city was 50.0% male and 50.0% female.

2000 census
As of the census of 2000, there were 150 people, 59 households, and 46 families residing in the city. The racial makeup of the city was 97.33% White, 2.00% from other races, and 0.67% from two or more races. Hispanic or Latino of any race were 4.00% of the population.

There were 59 households, out of which 33.9% had children under the age of 18 living with them, 67.8% were married couples living together, 6.8% had a female householder with no husband present, and 22.0% were non-families. 22.0% of all households were made up of individuals, and 11.9% had someone living alone who was 65 years of age or older. The average household size was 2.54 and the average family size was 2.93.

In the city, the population was spread out, with 30.0% under the age of 18, 9.3% from 18 to 24, 20.7% from 25 to 44, 21.3% from 45 to 64, and 18.7% who were 65 years of age or older. The median age was 36 years. For every 100 females, there were 120.6 males. For every 100 females age 18 and over, there were 105.9 males.

The median income for a household in the city was $32,250, and the median income for a family was $33,500. Males had a median income of $29,000 versus $22,188 for females. The per capita income for the city was $12,713. There were 8.3% of families and 13.8% of the population living below the poverty line, including 25.5% of under eighteens and 14.3% of those over 64.

Education
Galesburg is served by USD 101 Erie.

Galesburg High School was closed in 1967, through school unification. The Galesburg High School mascot was Pirates.

References

External links
 Galesburg - Directory of Public Officials
 USD 101, local school district
 Galesburg city map, KDOT

Cities in Kansas
Cities in Neosho County, Kansas